Delta Gamma, commonly known as DG, is a women's fraternity in the United States and Canada with over 250,000 initiated members. It has 150 collegiate chapters and more than 200 alumnae groups. The organization's executive office is in Columbus, Ohio. Delta Gamma is one of 26 national fraternities under the umbrella organization of the National Panhellenic Conference.

History 
Delta Gamma was founded as a fraternity in December 1873 at the Lewis School for Girls in Oxford, Mississippi near the University of Mississippi. It was called a fraternity because the term sorority was not yet in use. The group's founders were Mary Comfort Leonard, Eva Webb Dodd, and Anna Boyd Ellington.

Initially, Delta Gamma's early growth was to women's colleges in the southern United States. Within a few years, Delta Gamma expanded into the northern United States and into the East with the help of George Banta, a member of Phi Delta Theta fraternity and Delta Gamma's only male initiate. Banta played an integral part in the expansion of Delta Gamma to well-recognized northern colleges.

In 1882, Banta married Lillian Vawter, a Delta Gamma at Franklin College. In his later years, Banta helped rewrite the Delta Gamma ritual. He frequently visited Delta Gamma conventions, often participating as a guest speaker. He gave his last speech in 1934, a year before his death. Because of Banta, Delta Gamma retains close historical ties with Phi Delta Theta.

Delta Gamma was one of seven charter members of the National Panhellenic Conference when the first inter-sorority meeting was held in Boston, Massachusetts in 1891. Delta Gamma and the six other charter members formally joined the National Panhellenic Conference in 1902.

As of 2022, Delta Gamma has 150 collegiate chapters in the United States and Canada. It has more than 200 alumnae groups in the United States, Canada, and England.

In 2013, Delta Gamma founded the #IAmASororityWoman campaign for members of any sorority to start conversations about what sorority women truly value to combat common stereotypes.

Symbols 
Although Delta Gamma has no official jewel, the fraternity recognizes the anchor as its official symbol and bronze, pink, and blue as its official colors. The official flower is the cream-colored rose, registered as the Delta Gamma Cream Rose with the American Rose Society. This is the only sorority flower registered as such. The Hannah Doll is their mascot.

The badge of Delta Gamma is a golden anchor and may be worn only by initiated members. Before the adoption of the golden anchor, the symbol of Delta Gamma was simply an "H" for the word "Hope". In 1877, the Hope badge was changed to the traditional symbol of hope, the anchor. Today's badge has a small cable wrapping around the top of the anchor, with the Greek letters Tau Delta Eta (ΤΔΗ) on the crosspiece. Delta Gamma's motto is "Do Good."

Programs

Philanthropy 
The Delta Gamma Foundation was formed in 1951. It has three main philanthropic focuses: service for sight, grants to the fraternity for educational and leadership purposes, and grants to individual members. Members and local chapters contribute to its funds. Delta Gamma gives more than 150,000 volunteer hours to service for sight each year.

The fraternity is one of the first recipients of the Helen Keller Philanthropic Service Award, given by the American Foundation for the Blind for assistance to those who are visually impaired and for sight conservation. It was also the first recipient of the Virginia Boyce Award presented by Prevent Blindness America.Anchor Splash and Anchor Games are the Delta Gamma's fundraising events hosted on college campuses across North America. The proceeds raised at these events support Delta Gamma's philanthropies, such as service for sight. Anchor Splash is a synchronized swimming event. The event has different organizations on campus create a synchronized swimming dance. The dance is performed at Anchor Splash for an audience. Each chapter decides how to implement these events on its campus; for example, some chapters may host flag football tournaments or volleyball tournaments as their fundraiser.

Publications 
The official Delta Gamma magazine is the Anchora ("aNGkərə" not "ankôrə"), which has been published quarterly continuously since 1884. Delta Gamma members can submit photos and articles to be included The Anchora.

Membership and chapters 

Potential members must attend a college where there is a Delta Gamma chapter. Members join through either formal recruitment or continuous open bidding (COB). A COB can occur when a potential new member wants to join outside of recruitment. Joining outside of recruitment can happen any time of the year. 

There are 150 collegiate chapters across America and Canada. The Zeta Phi chapter at Harvard University announced in 2018 that it was closing due to Harvard's policy against gender-segregated organizations.

Notable members

See also 

List of social fraternities and sororities

Notes

References 

 
1873 establishments in Ohio
National Panhellenic Conference
Student organizations established in 1873
Student societies in the United States